War of the Worlds is an unreleased, monochrome vector graphics arcade game created by Tim Skelly of Cinematronics in 1982. It is based on the H. G. Wells 1898 novel The War of the Worlds. The game was developed as a 3D version of Space Invaders but was never put into production and fewer than ten units were made.

Gameplay
The game is a fixed shooter using 3D vector graphics. The player controls a tank object at the bottom of the screen and shoots towards the top of the screen at descending Tripods robots in a first person perspective. The player only has movement, cannon fire, and shields to protect them from the Tripods' lasers.

References

External links

War of the Worlds at Arcade History

1982 video games
Arcade video games
Arcade-only video games
Video games based on The War of the Worlds
Vector arcade video games
Video games developed in the United States
Fixed shooters